Überall zu Hause (English: At Home Everywhere) is the eighth studio album by Austrian recording artist Christina Stürmer. It was released by Polydor on 21 September 2018 in German-speaking Europe. In support of the album, Stürmer embarked on the Überall zu Hause Tour through Germany and Austria in 2019.

Track listing

Charts

Weekly charts

Year-end charts

References

External links 
 

Christina Stürmer albums
2018 albums
German-language albums